Plum Branch is a stream in Bates County in the U.S. state of Missouri. It is a tributary of Miami Creek.

Plum Branch was so named on account of the plum trees in the area.

See also
List of rivers of Missouri

References

Rivers of Bates County, Missouri
Rivers of Missouri